Malcolm X Boulevard could refer to
 Lenox Avenue in Manhattan, New York City, New York (on which both names are used)
 Reid Avenue, the northern extension of Utica Avenue in Brooklyn, New York City, New York (on which the older name is no longer in use)
 Congress Heights in Washington, D.C.